Wolperath is the third largest urban subdivision (Ortsteil) of the Neunkirchen-Seelscheid municipality in North Rhine-Westphalia, Rhein-Sieg, Germany. It is located southeast of Neunkirchen proper.

References

External links
 Gemeinde Neunkirchen-Seelscheid (in German)

Municipalities in North Rhine-Westphalia